Natural was an American boy band that formed in 1999 and broke up in 2004 consisting of Ben Bledsoe, Marc Terenzi, Michael 'J' Horn, Michael Johnson, and Patrick King.

They were best known for their debut single and signature song "Put Your Arms Around Me". They were successful in Germany and the Philippines, releasing two albums and nine singles.

History

Formation 
The original band was formed in 1999 when future members Marc Terenzi and Ben Bledsoe met at a party.  Terenzi and Bledsoe met future bandmates Patrick King and Michael Johnson at an industry party.  The four got together and after subsequent members joined and left (at one point they had 6 or 7 members total), settled on fifth member Michael Horn who Bledsoe had found through his vocal coach.

The five young men tried to get signed to record label on their own but ended up being turned down by most of the major labels.  The originally worked with manager Veit Renn and recorded several songs.  However the band eventually frustrated turned to Lou Pearlman, who had had success with some of the biggest boy bands in the world. Renn was not pleased with this and sued.  The outcome of the case is unknown though the band did eventually stay with Pearlman. The band was signed under Transcontinental Records and released albums under that label in the U.S. and Sony BMG abroad.

Unlike most boy bands who are vocal groups, the members of Natural all played instruments. Renn claims he was the one who insisted they learn instruments, spending $75,000 on their training. However certain members such as Horn and Terenzi had been playing since childhood.

Bledsoe played bass and was one of the lead vocals, Terenzi played guitar as well as being one of the lead vocals. Horn became J Horn, to avoid confusion. He played piano and was the final lead vocal (though in subsequent years as he withdrew from the band he was featured less), while Patrick King also played guitar, and Johnson played the drums.

The band realized that they could not promote themselves easily without having to bring their instruments with them everywhere they went, so they started performing a cappella versions of their music. This method was successful as their first show at the House of Blues in Orlando, Florida was completely sold out.

Soon after, they kept building by Bledsoe learning how to beat box and do vocal bass lines with the band in the a cappella setting. Then, after realizing that both Johnson and King had extensive training in dance, the band added a few up tempo Rock style dance songs to their set. These were only seen on their tours, as it was a way to keep the show changing and more interesting.  They would also switch instruments to allow one singer to have more front time for a specific song, such as "What If" and "Why it Hurts" where Terenzi would play bass and allow Bledsoe to take the front of the stage.

2000: Debut and U.S. attempt 
In the summer of 2000, Pearlman hired Steve Kipner to write Natural's first single, "Put Your Arms Around Me". He also struck a deal with teenage accessories store Claire's. The store sold the single as an extra with a $12 or more purchase. A joint tour with The Monkees in conjunction with Claire's followed. However the single never actually charted on the Billboard Hot 100. The single became No. 3 on the Billboard Hot 100 Single Sales Chart yet that had little impact on the general public.

Natural attempted promotions in the U.S. several times in the next few years, though sporadically. Such promotions included several interviews and features in POPstar Magazine, performing in the Macy's Thanksgiving Day Parade 2001, performing medley tribute to the Bee Gees as part of ABC's 'Disco Ball' in 2003, and at one point a mall tour with Saks Fifth Avenue. Yet they still never charted or had successful radio play outside of Orlando.

2001: German album debut and success 
Pearlman decided to wait on the U.S. release and the band went back to Germany where their first album Keep It Natural was released. The album exploded onto the top of the charts in many territories across the world, and debuted at No. 2 in Germany. This was only the beginning.  The band continued with 8 top 10 singles and multiple Number 1's.  The tours grew from Club-sized venues to Arena Tours.

The single and the album did quite well, and tours followed around Germany.  The band also experienced success in Malaysia and Japan as well as the Philippines.  These were the Asian countries where they had the most success, winning several awards (see awards section).

The band began performing at NASA events in 2001. They sang at the launch of the Space Shuttle Endeavour at the start of its 16th flight. They also performed "The Star-Spangled Banner" for the crew of the Space Shuttle Columbia before it launched. They were planning to co-write a space-themed song with astronaut William C. McCool before his death in the Space Shuttle Columbia disaster.

2003: New direction and disagreements 
The days of pop boy bands had long passed even in Germany, and the members were adamant about trying out their own new sound.  With each of their poppier singles progressively dropping on the charts (for instance "Put Your Arms Around Me" reached No. 12, while the fourth single, "Runaway", only reached #40) the guys felt it was time to change.

The style they wished to change to was a more mature, acoustic pop/rock with harmonies similar to the style of Lifehouse and The Calling.  The band tried to release "Paradise" as a single, but Pearlman was hesitant about the new sound.  Some form of a compromise was reached when Paradise was released as a radio-only single.  Rumors of a planned US release followed, however (minus local Orlando airplay in the
summer of 2003) nothing ever became of it.

For their next single, Pearlman initially tried to launch "Left 2 Right" on Radio Disney in the summer of 2004, 2 years after the release of Keep It Natural. Instead, Pearlman gave in and made another compromise: the release of the guitar ballad "What If?".  Unlike the rest of the songs on the album, however, "What If?" featured no writing credits from the band members. Again, talk of an American release occurred and actually did happen, but the single failed to chart.  In Germany, it reached a little higher than "Runaway" by hitting No. 34.

Feeling encouraged, their second album It's Only Natural went ahead as planned, with all songs but "What If?" written by at least one member of the band. Ben Bledsoe and Marc Terenzi shared the most writing credits, while Patrick King and Michael 'J' Horn only participated in writing one song on the release.  The vocal contributions of each member changed on this album as well.  The verses on Keep It Natural mostly rotated through Marc, J, and Ben.  The new album featured mainly either Ben Bledsoe or Marc Terenzi on the vocals, with the other one taking harmonies or a verse.  Patrick only appeared in one song, and J didn't even have a solo, likely due to his desire to move on from the band.  However, Michael's role had drastically changed, with him sharing harmonies and occasionally lead vocals (unlike the Keep It Natural era when he was only featured on a bonus track).  For instance, on "Cabdriver", he shared lead vocal duties with Ben.

An uptempo single in their new, rock-oriented sound was released, entitled "Let Me Just Fly".  In Germany, this single charted higher than the previous two, reaching No. 23.  With the renewed success of the band, a string of other singles, such as "Cabdriver", were planned for release; however, the band's breakup disrupted these ambitions.

2002–2003: Split 
Rumors were rife with why the band was splitting. Marc Terenzi had met German pop star Sarah Connor in the summer of 2002 and against Pearlman's wishes had kept dating her. In June 2003 it was announced that Sarah Connor was pregnant and the couple was engaged. Pearlman didn't like this and wanted Terenzi replaced. Terenzi was a founding member, and the other members were not about to fall for it, so they decided to split – except for Patrick King.

Summer 2004: The end of the original
With the split of the original lineup imminent, the members quickly released a duet with Sarah Connor called "Just One Last Dance".  It was more of a 'Marc and Sarah' duet due to the fact his vocals were the only ones featured from the band.  The single was wildly successful, becoming Natural's only No. 1 and Sarah's 3rd. The band announced they would go on a final tour in support of their album for the summer of 2004.  However, Michael 'J' Horn had previous commitments and decided not to join.  Mike Castonguay, the band's musical director and producer, replaced him for the tour. Before the split had been decided, "3 Miles" and "Cabdriver" (which only appeared on the Japanese release) had been planned as possible singles.  A video was even shot for "Cabdriver" (with a 30s theme), though it was never released.  The final single officially released was "Why It Hurts" (also a Japanese bonus track).  The song had moderate success, and the band finished its tour thus ending the original Natural.

Aftermath in the name
In November 2004 it was announced that Lou Pearlman was going to keep on with the 'Natural idea' at least in name. Instead of boy banding them he had original member Patrick King and four new members who now were going to be doing rock music instead of pop.  This did not sit well with many fans of the original band.

A year and a half passed, and the 'New Natural' had failed to even match the poor success of the later original Natural years. In early 2006 Pearlman's band renamed themselves "Well Worn Zero", and the name "Natural" was retired for the moment.

However once "Well Worn Zero" was dropped by Transcon, Pearlman decided he wasn't done with the "Natural" name.  In the July/August 2006 issue of Orlando Style magazine, the 2am girls made the following statement about Pearlman's bands quote:
"...and some super cute members of the British boys who are new additions to the rock group, Natural." But nothing further developed with the band and, in early 2007, Pearlman was indicted on several fraud charges. Pearlman was convicted of creating a Ponzi scheme defrauding investors of $300 million and died in prison 2016 with Natural not reuniting during the remainder of his life.

Legacy

Original members' subsequent projects
 Ben Bledsoe started a solo career in 2005 and released his own indie solo CD Insomniac's Guide to a Lonely Heart, for which he wrote much of the music and lyrics.  He toured the US and Germany in support of it.  He has also acted in several television shows and films.
 Marc Terenzi married Sarah Connor in March 2004 shortly after the birth of their son Tyler. The family starred in their own reality show Sarah and Marc in Love that summer, and shortly after he released his own CD Awesome which was again mostly written by himself. The singles "Heat Between the Sheets" and "Love to Be Loved by You" both did well on the German chart, reaching the top 10. In 2006, he became a father for the second time with the birth of his daughter Summer, but in 2008 Connor and Terenzi separated. Terenzi formed a new band ("Terenzi") and is preparing new material.
 Michael 'J' Horn married his girlfriend Olivia, and both reside in Winter Park, Florida. Horn currently teaches music, and is still acting and musically directing several plays in the Orlando area.
 Patrick King was last known to still be in the 2nd version of Natural. In 2006 after a year and a half keeping the name "Natural" the band finally renamed itself "Well Worn Zero". In April 2006 they were dropped by Transcontinental Records.  Last news was they would be going 'indie'; however that idea seems to have been dropped and the group has disbanded. King is currently pursuing acting in Los Angeles, California. He had a small role in the movie It's Complicated.
 Michael Johnson teamed up with former Natural producer Mike Castonguay and created a punk blues band called Lukewarm Freeda.  He also plays with other acts such as In For The Kill, Lover's Revolt, Jake Coco, Capra and New Beat Fund in the Los Angeles area.

In popular culture
 Three members of Natural provided voices for the 2001 The Simpsons episode, "New Kids on the Blecch"; Ben Bledsoe for Ralph Wiggum, Marc Terenzi for Nelson Muntz and Michael 'J' Horn for Milhouse Van Houten.

Discography

Studio albums

Singles

Track listings
The following singles do not have individual pages.
 Will It Ever
 "Will It Ever"
 "Will It Ever" (old school mix)
 "Will It Ever" (club mix)
 "Will It Ever" (instrumental version)
 "Blue"
 Runaway
 "Runaway"
 "Runaway" (live video version)
 "Runaway" (instrumental version)
 "Still Gotta Live With Myself"
 Paradise
CD1
 "Paradise"
 "Let Me Count The Ways" (acoustic version)

CD2
 "Paradise"
 "I'll Be Back For More"
 "Paradise" (video)
 What If
 "What If" (Eric Nova radio mix)
 "What If" (radio edit)
 "What If" (acoustic version)
 Let Me Just Fly
 "Let Me Just Fly" (original)
 "3 Miles"
 "Let Me Just Fly" (acoustic live version)
 "Let Me Just Fly" (video)
 Just One Last Dance
 "Just One Last Dance" (radio edit)
 "Just One Last Dance" (college radio version)
 "Just One Last Dance" (Kaybor dance mix)
 "Just One Last Dance" (video version)
 "Work It Right (Tonight)"
 "Just One Last Dance" (video)
 Why It Hurts
 "Why It Hurts"
 "Cabdriver"
 "Why It Hurts" (video)

Awards
 MTV Asia "Artist of the Month"
 German Silver Otto Award
 2002 MTV Philippines Debut Artist of the Year
 Popcorn Magazine's "Artist of the Year" award

References

External links
 Archived Transcontinental Page
 [ Allmusic entry]
 Ben Bledsoe's Official Website
 Marc Terenzi's Official Website (in German)

American boy bands
Musical groups from Orlando, Florida
American pop music groups
Vocal quintets
Sony BMG artists